William Harbour may refer to:
 William Harbour (priest), archdeacon of Southland, New Zealand
 William Harbour (footballer) (1869–1928), English footballer
 William E. Harbour (1942–2020), American civil rights activist
 J. William Harbour, American ophthalmologist, ocular oncologist and cancer researcher